Bokhtariyon is a town and jamoat in Tajikistan. It is located in Kushoniyon District in Khatlon Region. The population of the town is 7,900 (January 2020 estimate).

References

Populated places in Khatlon Region
Jamoats of Tajikistan